Patihani is a part of metropolitan Bharatpur in Chitwan District in Bagmati Province of southern Nepal. At the time of the 1991 Nepal census it had a population of 8,798 people living in 1,752 individual households.

References

Populated places in Chitwan District